Farashganj Sporting Club Women commonly known as Farashganj SC Women is a Bangladeshi Women's association football club from Farashganj, Dhaka. They participate in Bangladesh Women's Football League, the women's premier football league in Bangladesh.

History
The Farashganj SC Women was founded on 20 May 2010. The club have played their debut game on 16 November 2022 versus FC Brahmanbaria at Dhaka which defeated by 0–4 goals. The club will compete in the  2021–22 Bangladesh Women's Football League which starts in November 2022 after 3 seasons.

Current squad
Farashganj SC Women squad for 2021—22 season.

Competitive record

Head coach records

Club management

Current technical staff

Board of Directors
As of 5 November 2022

References

2011 establishments in Bangladesh
Dhaka
Association football clubs established in 2011
Women's football clubs in Bangladesh